St. Vincent of Paul Catholic Church is a historic Roman Catholic church located at Cape Vincent in Jefferson County, New York, under the authority of the Diocese of Ogdensburg.

Description 
Built in 1858, the church is a stone Gothic Revival-style structure consisting of two gabled limestone sections: a one-story rectangular main block and an attached modern side wing. It features a three-stage tower with a limestone base, a wood midsection, and a domed cupola topped by a round finial and simple cross.

It was listed on the National Register of Historic Places in 1985.

References 

Churches on the National Register of Historic Places in New York (state)
Roman Catholic churches in New York (state)
Gothic Revival church buildings in New York (state)
Roman Catholic churches completed in 1858
19th-century Roman Catholic church buildings in the United States
Churches in Jefferson County, New York
National Register of Historic Places in Jefferson County, New York
Roman Catholic parishes in the Diocese of Ogdensburg